Parkton is an agrarian unincorporated area in the northern part of Baltimore County, Maryland, United States. It borders southern York County, Pennsylvania, which forms part of the Mason–Dixon line. The area is mostly agricultural in nature with corn, soy beans and other industrial use crops being the major plants grown.

Approximately 6,600 people live within ZIP code 21120.

Notable events

It was the location for the filming of the movie Guarding Tess (1994).

Maryland State Police weigh and inspection facility located in Parkton (off I-83 southbound).

The Torrey C. Brown Rail Trail that passes through Parkton used to be the Northern Central Railway that Abraham Lincoln once traveled to Baltimore.

Schools
 Hereford High School
 Our Lady of Grace School
 Seventh District Elementary School

Transportation

Highways

Climate
The climate in this area is characterized by hot, humid summers and generally mild to cool winters.  According to the Köppen Climate Classification system, Parkton has a humid subtropical climate, abbreviated "Cfa" on climate maps.

References

External links

Unincorporated communities in Baltimore County, Maryland
Unincorporated communities in Maryland